Sukkat Shalom Reform Synagogue, a member of the Movement for Reform Judaism,  is a Reform Jewish community based in Wanstead  in the London Borough of Redbridge. Its rabbi (since 2008) is Rabbi Larry Becker.

The synagogue is housed in the restored Grade II* listed building that had been the chapel of Wanstead Hospital  (previously the Merchant Seamen's Orphan's Asylum).

See also
 List of Jewish communities in the United Kingdom
 List of synagogues in the United Kingdom
 Movement for Reform Judaism

References

External links
Official website

Reform synagogues in the United Kingdom
Synagogues in London
Religion in the London Borough of Redbridge